Organización Soriana is a Mexican public company and a major retailer in Mexico with more than 824 stores. Soriana is a grocery and department store retail chain headquartered in Monterrey, Nuevo Leon, Mexico. The company is 100% capitalized in Mexico and has been publicly traded on the Mexican stock exchange (Bolsa Mexicana de Valores), since 1987 under the symbol: "Soriana".

Overview

Soriana was founded in 1968 by Mexican entrepreneurs and brothers, Francisco and Armando Martín Borque, in Torreón, Coahuila. The company currently, as of 2013, operates under the brands Soriana, Clubes City Club, Hipermart, Mercado Soriana, and Super City. Super City is the company's convenience store division brand. It operates supermarkets and department stores for consumer and wholesale markets.

Soriana competes primarily with H-E-B, La Comer, Chedraui, S-Mart and Walmex. Soriana emphasizes that it is Mexican-owned and operated. It is not uncommon to see advertising circulars from competitors Wal-Mart, Bodega Aurrerá, Superama, Chedraui, Alsuper or H-E-B posted around the store with certain items highlighted, pointing out that these items are cheaper at Soriana, a common practice in retail store environments.

On December 6, 2007, Organizacion Soriana acquired Supermercados Gigante for US$1.35 billion. In 2008, Soriana replaced the existing Gigante stores including its seven stores in the United States (U.S. stores were sold in May to Chedraui). Most Mexican stores retained Supermercados Gigante props like point of sale systems and food equipment.

In 2012, it had more than 606 stores in 208 cities in Mexico under 5 store formats, which include 249 Soriana Híper, 105 Soriana Súper, 147 Mercado Soriana, 72 Soriana Express and 33 City Club. It also had 14 distribution centers. In 2006, for reporting and administrative purposes, Soriana moved its headquarters from Torreón to Monterrey.

Store formats

Soriana Híper

Soriana's flagship format created in 1968, whose store formats are hypermarkets that focus on consumers located in cities with more than 150,000 inhabitants, which have a sales floor area of 4,000 to 11,000 m2. They operate under the retail sales scheme, in which they handle a wide assortment of merchandise with 50,000 SKU's from the clothing, general merchandise, grocery and perishable food divisions. They have a shopping center made up of 40 or 50 small stores that the Company rents to third parties, who market products and services to the consumer.

Its main competitors are:
 Walmart Supercenter (Walmart) (Main competitor nationwide)
 Chedraui from Grupo Comercial Chedraui
 Casa Ley (Hypermarket)
 H-E-B (Partially)
 LaComer (Partially)
 Until January 3, 2016, it was competing against Comercial Mexicana, from Controladora Comercial Mexicana.

In 2008, most of the Gigante Stores were converted to Soriana Híper, as well as some Bodega Gigante, three Super Gigantes in Baja California Norte and one Super Maz store in Mérida.

In 2017, Soriana converted 14 Comercial Mexicana stores from Baja California Norte into Soriana Híper and in 2018, Soriana converted part of the 47 formats of Tienda Comercial Mexicana to Soriana Híper, mainly in northern areas of Mexico, as well as in the cities of Mazatlán, Culiacán, Hermosillo, La Paz, Veracruz, Mérida, Zamora and Celaya.

Likewise, Soriana Híper has two sub-formats, such as Soriana Híper Plus and MEGA Soriana, the latter derived from the purchase of Comercial Mexicana in 2016:

Soriana Híper Plus
It is a subformat of the Soriana Híper stores in which it is located in mature markets with areas with high purchasing power customers. This format was designed to provide, in addition to what Soriana Híper offers, high value products such as wines or gourmet foods, in which its merchandise level extends to 60,000 SKU's in addition to its stores being redesigned.

Its main competitors are:
 HEB (mostly)
 La Comer from Grupo La Comer (mostly)
 Walmart Supercenter (partially)
 Selecto Chedraui (main competitor at the national level)
 Until January 3, 2016, it was partially competing against Comercial Mexicana in its Mega Comercial Mexicana format.

The following Soriana Híper stores are considered as Soriana Híper Plus:
 Gran Terraza Coapa (Mexico City)
 Plaza Miyana Polanco (Mexico City)
 Pilares (Mexico City)
 San Jerónimo (Mexico City)
 Viñedos (Torreón)
 Hipermart Independencia (Torreón)
 San Pedro (Monterrey)
 San Nicolás (Monterrey)
 Galerías Valle Oriente (Monterrey)

MEGA Soriana

This format was created by Soriana in 2017, derived from the purchase and sale of Comercial Mexicana. In that moment Soriana analyzed the proposal of the Mega Comercial Mexicana format, and once the license to operate the Comercial Mexicana formats was expired, Soriana would retain the name Mega, due to the acquisition of 70 properties assigned with the name. Of all the formats, Mega was the only one that Soriana kept from the previous owners.

This store format is also a subformat of Soriana Híper and it's aimed at cities with more than 150,000 inhabitants, in which they handle a wide assortment of merchandise with 60,000 SKU's, in addition to what the Soriana Híper stores offer, products such as gourmet foods and wines, as well as services in which its predecessor MEGA Comercial Mexicana operated before its transition to MEGA Soriana, such as Grand Café, Bocatto and Fábrica de Quesos. Its interior designs are similar to the recent and latest designs of the Comercial Mexicana stores before its reinvention as LaComer; including its coffee shop and pastry brands. Its average sales floor area ranges from 4,500 to 14,000 square meters

This move was confirmed with the conversion of Soriana Híper División del Norte in Mexico City, which now remains as Mega Soriana as of March 2017. In 2018, most of the stores in the center, south and southeast zones of Mexico that previously had the Comercial Mexicana and Mega Comercial Mexicana formats were converted into Mega Soriana, as well as some Bodega Comercial Mexicana units in the states of Mexico, Guerrero, Hidalgo, San Luis Potosí and Morelos.

As a mega market, its main competitors are:
 HEB
 La Comer
 Walmart Supercenter
 Chedraui and Selecto Chedraui

Soriana Súper

Format created in 2008, derived from the purchase of Tiendas Gigante by the company, based on the original Super G stores. They are stores that handle daily consumption products such as Groceries, Perishables and Prepared Foods, in which made with the objective of proportional to the consumer agile and fast purchases, under a sales floor area of 500 to 4,000 m2 and are located mainly in three areas: areas with middle and high income population (residential subdivisions), in areas whose areas and / or dimensions it is not possible to locate a Soriana Híper store and cities where there were many Gigante stores, which, varying in size, were converted to Soriana Super.

As a generalist supermarket, its competing stores are:
 Calimax
 Sumesa (La Comer Group)
 Walmart Express;
 Super Ley and Super Ley Express
 Super Chedraui
 Aka Superbodega, by Grupo Arteli

In 2008, all the Super Gs were converted into Soriana Súper (except one branch in Tijuana and two in Ensenada, which changed to Soriana Híper); most of the Super MAZ stores; and some stores Gigante and Bodegas Gigante, whose sales areas were less than 4,000m2.

In 2015, Soriana acquired and transformed the four Super Frutería del Sol stores in the Sonoran border city of San Luis Río Colorado to Soriana Super.

In 2018, Soriana converted two Comercial Mexicana stores in Acapulco and Cancún into Soriana Super, since both had a surface area of less than 3,000 m2. each.

Likewise, Soriana Súper has two sub-formats, such as Soriana Súper Plus and Soriana Supermarket, in which both sub-formats are "fresh market":

Soriana Súper Plus
It is the premium sub-format of Soriana Súper created in 2011 where, in addition to what Soriana Súper offers, grocery products and imported foods such as exotic meats are handled. Its first branch was installed on the foundations where Soriana Super Marne was located, a store that was previously part of Gigante.

As a premium supermarket format, its main partial competitors are chain stores such as:
 Aladdin's
 Select Super Chedraui
 City Market of Grupo La Comer

Soriana Supermarket
It is the fresh market sub-format of Soriana Super created in 2020 in which they handle grocery products, perishable goods and prepared food, as well as wines and gourmet foods. As a fresh market supermarket format, its main competitors are:
 Super Ley Express Fresh from Casa Ley (mainly, by location of the first branch)
 Super Chedraui
 Fresko from Grupo La Comer (main competitor at the national level)
 Until October 2020, it was competing with Superama. As of November 2020, Soriana Súper is a direct competitor of Walmex's now renamed Walmart Express.

The following Soriana Súper stores are considered as Soriana Súper Plus and Soriana Supermarket:
 Marne (Monterrey)
 Pueblo Serena (Monterrey)
 Valle (Monterrey)
 Plaza Nativa (Monterrey)
 Valle Poniente (Monterrey)
 Plaza Universidad (Guadalajara)
 Plaza Terranova (Guadalajara)
 Pablo Neruda (Guadalajara)
 Cititower (Guadalajara)
 Urbania (Guadalajara)
 Eugenia (Mexico City)
 Santa Fe Paradox (Mexico City)
 Toriello (Mexico City)
 Town Square Metepec (Toluca)
 Kukulkan Plaza (Cancún)
 Misión San José (San José del Cabo, BCS)
 Gavilanes (Zacatecas)
 Sendera Colima (Colima)
 Costa Azul (Acapulco)

Soriana Mercado

Format created in 2003, in which they are self-service warehouses with an average sales floor area of 4,000 to 5,000 m2., Focused mainly on cities with 50,000 to 150,000 inhabitants and in popular areas in large and medium cities where it is not possible to locate a Soriana Híper store. They handle the fastest-moving products in the hypermarkets of the grocery, perishables, prepared food divisions, and a selection of clothing and general merchandise products. They are shops with modest decoration, with a good level of comfort. In some cities, Soriana Mercado changes to Soriana Híper if there is more demand than the store covers; so the transition is noticeable in the design. In the event that the store's demand is less than what it covers, in that case, change to the Soriana Express subformat.

As a self-service warehouse type, its main competitors are:
 Bodega Aurrerá
 Chedraui and Super Che
 Casa Ley
 Until January 3, 2016, it was competing against Comercial Mexicana in its Bodega Comercial Mexicana format.

In 2008, Soriana converted most of the Bodega Gigante and some Gigante stores into Soriana Mercado. In 2018, Soriana converted a large part of the 32 formats of Bodega Comercial Mexicana to Soriana Mercado, and in the case of the center of the country, firstly Soriana kept the Bodega brand temporarily, and later, in 2019, change to Soriana Mercado permanently.
Likewise, in 2018, Soriana converted the Comercial Mexicana Texcoco Aeropuerto store into Soriana Mercado, because the store has a surface area of less than 4,900 m2, whose surface was counterproductive to be converted into MEGA Soriana.

Soriana Express

Subformat of Mercado Soriana created in 2010 based on areas, cities or towns where neither Soriana Híper nor Mercado Soriana can be located; suitable for cities of 10,000 to 90,000 inhabitants. They are stores with an average sales area of 1,500 square meters and are located mainly in areas with a low and middle-income population, in which they offer everything necessary to satisfy consumer needs in populations where they are present, such as groceries, clothing, etc. prepared foods, perishable and general merchandise in a moderate but complete way.

As a rural supermarket, they compete mainly with:
 My Bodega Aurrerá
 Ley Express and Super Ley Express
 Super Kompras Micro
 Super Che
 Some independent local stores in each town where Soriana is present.
 Until January 3, 2016, it competed with Alprecio, from Comercial Mexicana.

In the 2010s, Soriana converted some Gigante, Bodega Gigante and Super Maz stores into Soriana Express where these requirements were met.
In 2019, after temporarily using the Bodega Soriana brand, Soriana converted the three Alprecio stores into Soriana Express.

City Club

Format created in 2002, which consists of stores in the form of a warehouse club with an area of between 7,000 and 11,000 square meters of sales floor, to which there is income only by paying a membership and are focused on high-volume families of consumption and institutional clients (hospitals, hotels, restaurants and small businesses).

They operate under the wholesale and half wholesale scheme, present the products in large containers and / or multiple packages, operate with large purchase volumes and low marketing margins. They handle 5,000 SKUs from the grocery, perishables, clothing and general merchandise divisions.

Its direct competitors are:
 Sam's Club (mainly nationally)
 Costco Wholesale (primarily nationwide)
 Ley Mayoreo and Super Mayoreo Ley (competitor to some extent, due to its wholesale sales scheme)
 Centrals or Supply Markets of the cities where it is present.

In 2008, Soriana converted two Gigante stores in Mexico City and Querétaro and a Bodega Gigante store in Puebla into City Club, this because they were Gigante stores where there were already Soriana in the vicinity of them (mainly) or where, having at least two or more Gigante branches and one of the two buildings would have already been converted.

Super City

Format created in 2005 under the format of convenience stores which have a sales surface area between 70 and 80 m2 and currently no longer operate under the franchise system. They handle last minute shopping products such as coffee, snacks, sweets, bakery, groceries and beverages, among others.

Its main competitors are:
 Oxxo (FEMSA)
 7- Eleven (Chapa House)
 Extra (Model Group)
 Circle K
 Super Kiosko (Only in Sinaloa, Nayarit, Jalisco, Colima and Michoacán)
 Bodega Aurrerá Express (competing to some extent, because it is an express supermarket)
 Chedraui Supercito (competitor to some extent, because it is an express supermarket)
 Farmacias Guadalajara (competing to some extent, since it is a super pharmacy)

Sodimac Homecenter
In 2016, Soriana entered into a collaboration agreement with the Chilean retail company Falabella for the opening of stores of the Sodimac chain in Mexican territory. The deal gives Soriana and Falabella 50-50 equal control of Sodimac's Mexican subsidiary. Its first store opened on August 3, 2018, in the municipality of Cuautitlán Izcalli, State of Mexico in the metropolitan area of the Valley of Mexico, next to a Mega Soriana supermarket. Other openings have occurred in the municipalities of Tlalnepantla and Naucalpan in the same state, in the municipality of Cuernavaca in the state of Morelos, as well as in the states of Veracruz and San Luis Potosí.

These stores are formats dedicated to the sale of construction material (Sodimac Constructor), hardware, home improvement and DIY, as well as services related to these activities, and installed in properties where Soriana already had another of its formats (especially those of the Mega Soriana and Soriana Híper formats).

Its main competitor at the national level is the North American The Home Depot, as well as local hardware stores such as Ferreterías Fix and Comex. Due to the type of turnaround of its departments, it also competes indirectly against The Home Store from Grupo Gigante, Zara Home of Grupo Inditex and Bed Bath & Beyond. Before leaving the Mexican market, it also competed against the North American Lowe's.

Promotions in Soriana
Soriana promotes its "Tarjeta del Aprecio" (appreciation card), whereby customers who purchase items earn points for free merchandise, and in-store credits for 20% off in general merchandise.

Sponsor
Soriana is currently the shirt sponsor for the Primera División de la Federación Mexicana de Fútbol (Mexico's Top League) football club Santos Laguna.

Slogans and trade names

Donde Todos los Días son Buenos Días, Where all Days are Good Days (late 1970s)
Responde cuando usted lo necesita, Responds when you need it (1988)
Todos los Caminos Conducen a Soriana, All Ways Lead to Soriana (1990)
Lo Mejor al Mejor Precio, The Best at the Best Prices (1993)
En Suma Pagas Menos, pun meaning Pay Less for the Total or In Short, Pay Less (mid 1990s)
Nuestros Precios Hablan, Our Prices Speak (1999, 2011)
Apre¢io Por Ti or A pre¢io Por Ti, a pun meaning both (At the Right) Pri¢e for You or E$teem for You (2000)
Mejores Ofertas a Precios Más Bajos, Better Offers at Lower Prices (2001)
El Precio Más Bajo Garantizado, The Lowest Price Guaranteed (2002)
El Mayor Ahorro, The Greatest Savings (2007)
Porque nos importas tú, Because We Care for You (2008)
¡Hazlo hiper, y ahorra!, Do hyper, and save! (2013)

Evolution
Store openings by state:
1968 Coahuila
1971 Durango
1972 Chihuahua
1974 Nuevo León
1984 Tamaulipas
1989 Zacatecas
1990 Aguascalientes
1994 Jalisco, Guanajuato
1997 Querétaro
1998 San Luis Potosí, Veracruz, Tlaxcala
1999 Michoacán, Colima, Sinaloa, Sonora, Tabasco, Hidalgo, Puebla
2000 Nayarit
2001 Oaxaca
2002 Yucatán, Chiapas, Baja California Sur
2003 Campeche, Quintana Roo
2005 State of México
2006 Baja California
2007 Distrito Federal, Guerrero
2008 Morelos

Criticisms and controversies

Mexico's 2012 Presidential Elections Soriana gift cards vote buy
At a news conference, the leftist candidate Andrés Manuel López Obrador claimed that the election was "plagued with irregularities" and accused the Institutional Revolutionary Party (PRI) of allegedly buying votes in favor of Enrique Peña Nieto. He also claims that the PRI handed out gifts to lure voters to cast their vote in favor of them. During the day of the 2012 presidential elections, people who voted for el PRI would receive pre-paid gift cards. Nonetheless, the PRI and the store denied such accusation and threatened to sue López Obrador. Peña Nieto vowed to imprison anyone – including members of the PRI – if they are found guilty of electoral fraud. Despite Enrique's statement many videos by citizens about the Soriana cards surfaced on YouTube.

See also
List of companies traded on the Bolsa Mexicana de Valores
List of Mexican companies
Economy of Mexico
Comercial Mexicana
Chedraui

References

External links

 

 
Companies based in Monterrey
Retail companies established in 1968
Companies listed on the Mexican Stock Exchange
Mexican brands
Convenience stores
Supermarkets of Mexico
1968 establishments in Mexico